Thangayur is a village in the west of Salem District, Tamil Nadu, India.

Nearest Post Office : Thangayur
Occupation of people: Agriculture, road haulage
Total Families: 250
Nearest town: Konganapuram, Sankari
Religion: Hindu

Villages in Salem district